Molla Wagué (born 21 February 1991) is a professional footballer who plays as a centre back. Born in France, he represented the country at U19 youth level before switching to the Mali senior national team.

Club career
Wagué started his professional career with French club SM Caen. He made his professional debut on 6 November 2011 in a 3–0 league victory against Dijon. Two weeks later, in his first professional start, he scored his first professional goal in a 2–2 draw with Ajaccio.

On 10 July 2014, he joined Serie A club Udinese on loan after signing a contract with Granada.

On 31 January 2017, Wagué joined Leicester City on loan from Udinese until the end of the season. The transfer was consented to by parent club Granada and included an option for Leicester to sign him permanently. He made his debut in an FA Cup defeat away at Millwall playing around 70 minutes before being replaced due to an injury which would result in him missing the rest of the season. Wagué then joined Udinese permanently before being loaned out to Watford on 31 August 2017.

On 1 February 2019, Wagué joined EFL Championship side Nottingham Forest on loan for the remainder of the season.

On 12 January 2022, Wagué signed for Belgian club Seraing until the end of the 2021–22 season. The contract was terminated on 7 February 2022 by mutual consent for personal reasons.

International career
A former France youth international at the under-19 level, Wagué switched his allegiance to Mali and was a member of the Mali national team at the 2013 Africa Cup of Nations in South Africa.

Career statistics

Club

International

Scores and results list Mali's goal tally first, score column indicates score after each Wagué goal.

Honours
Mali
Africa Cup of Nations bronze: 2013

References

External links
 
 

Living people
1991 births
French sportspeople of Malian descent
People from Vernon, Eure
Sportspeople from Eure
Association football defenders
Malian footballers
Mali international footballers
French footballers
France youth international footballers
Stade Malherbe Caen players
Granada CF footballers
Udinese Calcio players
Leicester City F.C. players
Watford F.C. players
Nottingham Forest F.C. players
FC Nantes players
Amiens SC players
R.F.C. Seraing (1922) players
Ligue 1 players
Serie A players
Ligue 2 players
Premier League players
2013 Africa Cup of Nations players
2015 Africa Cup of Nations players
2017 Africa Cup of Nations players
2019 Africa Cup of Nations players
French expatriate footballers
Malian expatriate footballers
Expatriate footballers in Spain
Expatriate footballers in Italy
Expatriate footballers in England
Expatriate footballers in Belgium
Malian expatriate sportspeople in Spain
Malian expatriate sportspeople in Italy
Malian expatriate sportspeople in Belgium
Malian expatriate sportspeople in England
French expatriate sportspeople in Spain
French expatriate sportspeople in Italy
French expatriate sportspeople in England
French expatriate sportspeople in Belgium
Footballers from Normandy